Thomas Victor Nicholas Satriano (born August 28, 1940) is an American former professional baseball player. Although he began his professional career as a third baseman, he converted to catcher and played 321 games as a backstop during a ten-year, 674-game Major League Baseball career from – for the Los Angeles / California Angels and Boston Red Sox.

Born in Pittsburgh, Satriano graduated from Loyola High School in Los Angeles and attended the University of Southern California, where he was a member of the Trojans' 1961 NCAA Tournament championship team. He signed with the Angels in July 1961 and was immediately placed on the team's Major League roster during its first season as an American League expansion team. He appeared in 35 games played as an infielder, and started 21 games at third base. All told, Satriano collected 365 hits during his MLB career, including 53 doubles.

Satriano's daughter Gina played for the Colorado Silver Bullets, a women's baseball team.
She is currently an Assistant District Attorney in Los Angeles.

References

External links

1940 births
Living people
Baseball players from Los Angeles
Baseball players from Pennsylvania
Boston Red Sox players
California Angels players
Hawaii Islanders players
Los Angeles Angels players
Major League Baseball catchers
Major League Baseball third basemen
Nashville Vols players
Seattle Angels players
USC Trojans baseball players